Bialetti is an Italian brand founded by Alfonso Bialetti of coffee machines, cookware and small kitchen appliances. The brand is owned by Bialetti Industries.

History
Alfonso Bialetti first acquired his metal-working skills by working for a decade in the French aluminium industry. By 1919 he had established his own metal and machine workshop in Crusinallo (in his native Piedmont) to make aluminium products: this was the foundation of the Bialetti company. He transformed his workshop – Alfonso Bialetti & C. Fonderia in Conchiglia – into a studio for design and production. In 1933, Bialetti founded the brand and focused on manufacturing moka pots. The company was later operated by his son Renato Bialetti.

After a period of crisis in the 1970s and 1980s, Bialetti merged with Rondine Italia in 1993 and founded a new company named Bialetti Industrie S.p.A., based in Brescia.

Francesco Ranzoni acts as both President and CEO of the company.

At the end of 2015, the company's income statement registers a total revenue of €172.4 million, 6.9% more than 2014 (€161.2 million).

In 2010, a study calculated that 90% of Italian families own a moka pot made by Bialetti.

See also 

 De'Longhi

 Faema
 FrancisFrancis
 Gaggia
 La Marzocco
 Rancilio
 Saeco
 List of Italian companies

References

External links

Bialetti NZ

 
Coffee appliance vendors
Cooking appliance brands
Espresso machines
Home appliance brands
Home appliance manufacturers of Italy
Manufacturing companies established in 1933
Italian companies established in 1933
Italian brands
Coffee in Italy
Companies based in Omegna